Sham is a name which is used as a surname and a given name. People with the name include:

Surname
 Aristo Sham (born 1996), Hong Kong pianist
 Brad Sham (born 1949), American sportscaster 
 Fitri Sham (born 1994), Malaysian cricketer 
 Jimmy Sham (born 1987), Hong Kong activist
 Lu Jeu Sham (born 1938), American physicist
 Pak Sham, Hong Kong psychiatric geneticist
 Shirley Sham (born 1994), Chinese beauty pageant

Given name
 Sham Singh Atariwala (1790–1846), Sikh warrior
 Sham Kakade, American computer scientist
 Sham Khamis (born 1995), Australian soccer player,
 Sham Lal, multiple people 
 Sham Maskari, Omani singer
 Sham Raj, multiple people